Dennis Ray Paepke (born April 17, 1945) is an American former professional baseball catcher who appeared in 80 games over all or part of four Major League Baseball seasons for the Kansas City Royals.

Paepke was born in Long Beach, California, and graduated from Garden Grove's Rancho Alamitos High School in 1963. He had one of the highest batting averages in his high school's history, hitting over .700 during his senior year. After his graduation, he signed with the Los Angeles Angels, where his father, Jack, was the team's MLB bullpen coach. Dennis spent five full years in the Angel farm system until he was traded to the Royals, a first-year expansion team, in December 1968 along with catcher-outfielder Ed Kirkpatrick for Baseball Hall of Fame pitcher Hoyt Wilhelm. Paepke had a strong year offensively at Triple-A Omaha in 1969, and was recalled by the Royals for his first taste of MLB action in June. He batted only .111 in 27 at bats. But he hit only .204 with 31 total hits.

In 1974, Paepke suffered a career-shortening injury when he was spiked by a player with sharpened cleats, tearing ligaments in his left arm. He retired after the 1975 minor-league season. In his 80 games and 197 at bats in the major leagues, he collected 36 total hits with seven doubles to go along with his two homers. He had 14 career runs batted in, and batted .183.

External links
, or Retrosheet

1945 births
Living people
Arizona Instructional League Angels players
Baseball players from Long Beach, California
El Paso Sun Kings players
Idaho Falls Angels players
Jacksonville Suns players
Kansas City Royals players
Major League Baseball catchers
Omaha Royals players
Quad Cities Angels players
San Jose Bees players
Seattle Angels players
Tigres de Aragua players
American expatriate baseball players in Venezuela